Angels of Darkness, Demons of Light I is the sixth full-length studio album by the band Earth, released on Southern Lord Records. Cello is introduced as a new instrument, along with the usual ones being used since the album Hex. Dylan Carlson describes the album as more melodic and riff oriented. The second part of the album was released in 2012. The album illustrations were created by Stacey Rozich.

Reception

In the AllMusic review, Thom Jurek awarded the album 4 stars out of 5, describing the album as "harmony and dissonance coexist[ing] without antagonism, creating a heaviness and tension that are aesthetically beautiful and emotionally resonant." Pitchfork's Grayson Currin also gave the album a positive review, stating "In the 90s, Earth's heavy metal offered an escape, a massive shelter of volume and drone. But the intricacies of this Earth—Carlson's harmonics and harmonies, Davies' careful builds, Blau's unexpected bass maneuvers, Goldston's adventurous versatility—demand attention and immersion. That is, check in, not out, and you'll rarely hear four players with as much quiet command."

Track listing
All tracks by Earth

Personnel
Dylan Carlson  electric guitar and devices
Adrienne Davies  trap kit and percussives
Lori Goldston  cello and devices
Karl Blau  electric bass guitar

References

2011 albums
Earth (American band) albums